Coopmans's elaenia (Elaenia brachyptera) is a species of bird in the family Tyrannidae, the tyrant flycatchers.

It is found in southwestern Colombia and northwestern Ecuador.  Until 2016, it was considered a subspecies of the Lesser Elaenia. Its natural habitats are dry savanna, subtropical or tropical dry shrubland, subtropical or tropical seasonally wet or flooded lowland grassland, and heavily degraded former forest.

References

External links

Coopman's elaenia
Birds of the Colombian Andes
Birds of the Ecuadorian Andes
Coopman's elaenia